CKFI may refer to:

 CKFI-FM, a radio station (97.1 FM) licensed to Swift Current, Saskatchewan, Canada
 CFOB-FM, a radio station (93.1 FM) licensed to Fort Frances, Ontario, Canada, which held the call sign CKFI from 1944 to 1955